Bihar was an administrative county (comitatus) of the Kingdom of Hungary and a county of the Eastern Hungarian Kingdom and Principality of Transylvania (since the 16th century, when it was under the rule of the Princes of Transylvania). Most of its territory is now part of Romania, while a smaller western part belongs to Hungary. The capital of the county was Nagyvárad (now Oradea in Romania). Albrecht Dürer's father  was from this county.

Geography 

Bihar County was situated along the upper courses of the rivers Körös, Sebes-Körös, Fekete-Körös and Berettyó. The medieval county also included Kalotaszeg region (now Țara Călatei in Romania).

After 1876, Bihar county shared borders with the Hungarian counties Békés, Hajdú, Szabolcs, Szatmár, Szilágy, Kolozs, Torda-Aranyos and Arad. The western half of the county was in the Pannonian plain, while the eastern half was part of the Apuseni mountains (Erdélyi-középhegység). Its area was  around 1910.

History

Origins 

The origin of the name of Bihar is uncertain, however more theories exist. It could take its name from an ancient fortress in the current commune of Biharia. Or, the Hungarian Bihar derived from the word vihar (tempest, storm), that is of Slavic origin; vihor (whirlwind). Another theory is that Biharea is of Daco-Thracian etymology (bimeaning "two" and harati "take" or "lead"), possibly meaning two possessions of land in the Duchy of Menumorut.

The castle of Byhor, or Bihar (now Biharia in Romania), was the center of the duchy of Menumorut at the time of the Hungarian conquest of the Carpathian Basin in the 890s, according to the Gesta Hungarorum. The Gesta—the only primary source which mentions Menumorut—describes him as a ruler "with Bulgarian heart" who was the vassal of the Byzantine Emperor. Menumorut's subjects were Khazars, and the Székelys joined the invading Hungarians in his duchy. Historian Tudor Sălăgean writes that other peoples (including Romanians) must have also lived in Menumorut's realm. Menumorut was forced to give his daughter in marriage to Zoltán, son of Árpád, Grand Prince of the Hungarians. When he died, his son-in-law inherited his duchy. Modern scholars debate whether Menumorut and his duchy actually existed or the anonymous author of the Gesta invented them. According to historians György Györffy and Victor Spinei, the presence of Kabars in the region could have given rise to Anonymous' reference to Menumorut's "Khazars".

Place names of Slavic origin—for instance, Zomlyn (near modern Darvas in Hungary),  Csatár and Szalacs (now Cetariu and Sălacea in Romania)—show that Slav communities lived along the rivers Ér and Berettyó and around Bihar. Graves of 10th-century warriors, buried together with parts of their horses, have been excavated, for instance, at Bihar, Hajdúböszörmény, and Nagyszalonta (now Salonta in Romania). According to archaeologist Thomas Nägler, the small number of graves which can be attributed to 10th-century Hungarian warriors shows that few Hungarians settled in the region after the Hungarian conquest. Archaeologist Erwin Gáll writes that the cemetery at Bihar may represent a "peripheral centre" of a core region which was located along the upper courses of the river Tisza, because the burial customs were similar in the two territories. Almost a dozen medieval villages—for instance, Felkér, Köröskisjenő and Köröstarján  (now Felcheriu, Ineu and Tărian in Romania)—bore the name of a Hungarian tribe, suggesting that Hungarian groups settled in the region in the late 10th and early , according to György Györffy.

Written sources and toponyms implies the presence of Székelys. The castle folk of Ebey—a village, located near Nagyszalonta, which was later abandoned—were grouped into a "hundred", or centurionatus, named Székelyszáz around 1217. The Seat of Telegd was most probably named after the village Telegd (now Tileagd in Romania). If this scholarly theory is valid, the ancestors of the Székelys of Telegd had lived in Bihar County before they moved to eastern Transylvania. Historian Florin Curta writes that the Székelys settled in the county only in the early .

Modern historians agree that the county was established between 1020 and 1050, most probably by Stephen I, the first king of Hungary, or possibly by his successor, Peter. According to a version of a royal charter, issued in 1203, mentioned that "the whole Bihar County" was located partly around Bihar and partly around Zaránd (now Zărand in Romania), suggesting that Bihar County had originally included Zaránd County, or at least its territories north of the river Fehér-Körös. Another version of the same charter also mentioned Békés besides Bihar and Zaránd, implying that Bihar County had also included the lands which developed into the separate Békés County.

Middle Ages 

The 11th-century Bihar Castle, made of earth and timber, was the first center of the county. The earliest royal charter that mentioned the ispán, or head, of the county was issued around 1067. The county was included in the ducatus, or duchy, that Andrew I of Hungary granted to his younger brother, Béla, around 1050. Béla's son, Géza, ruled the duchy from 1064. Nomadic Turks—Pechenegs or Ouzes—plundered the eastern territories of the Kingdom of Hungary, including the region around Bihar Castle in 1068. Duke Géza, his brother, Ladislaus, and their cousin, King Solomon of Hungary, joined their forces and chased the marauders as far as Doboka (now Dăbâca in Romania). Six years later, "the troops from Byhor" were under the command of Duke Ladislaus in the Battle of Mogyoród which ended with the decisive victory of Géza and Ladislaus over King Solomon. The first document that mentioned the county was issued in 1075.

According to György Györffy, the county seems to have originally been included in the Roman Catholic Diocese of Eger, because the Deanery of Zsomboly, located to the south of Bihar County, formed an exclave of the Eger bishopric during the Middle Ages. The separate Roman Catholic Diocese of Bihar was set up between 1020 and 1061. Its see was transferred to Várad (now Oradea in Romania) before 1095. There were four deaneries in the county; the Deanery of Bihar was the first to have been documented (in 1213). Pilgrims frequented the shrine of King St Ladislaus in the Várad Cathedral after his canonization in 1192 and trials by ordeal were also held there.

Emeric, King of Hungary approached Pope Innocent III, asking him to make "Latins" abbot of the Greek monasteries in the Kingdom of Hungary to restore discipline. In a letter, written on 16 May 1204, the pope ordered Simon, the Catholic Bishop of Várad to visit the "Greek" monasteries and to set up a separate diocese, directly subjected to the Holy See, for them. According to historian Ioan-Aurel Pop, those "Greek" monasteries actually belonged to the local Orthodox Romanians'. Pop also writes that the Orthodox bishopric "in the country of Knez Bela", mentioned in a letter that Pope Innocent wrote to the Archbishop of Kalocsa in 1205, was located north of Oradea.

At least 19 villages—including Köröskisjenő, Mezőgyán and Mezősas in Bihar County, and Gyulavarsánd and Vadász (now Vărșand and Vânători) in Zaránd County—made up the honour of Bihar Castle in the early . The Várad Register—a codex which preserved the minutes of hundreds of ordeals held at the Várad Chapter between 1208 and 1235—provides information of the life of the commoners in the honour. The castle folk who were divided in "hundreds" provided well-specified services to the ispán. The Register mentioned the gatekeepers and the hunters of Bihar Castle. The Register also referred to "guest settlers" of foreign—Rus', German or "Latin"—origin. For instance, Walloon "guests" established Olaszi near Várad (now Olasig neighborhood in Oradea) before 1215.

Prelates and ecclesiastic institutions—including the bishops of Várad, the Dömös Chapter and the Garamszentbenedek Abbey—were the first beneficiaries. The western and southwestern lowlands were distributed among dozens of noble families, each holding only one village.

The Mongols captured and destroyed Várad during their invasion of Hungary in 1241, according to Roger of Torre Maggiore, who was archdeacon of the Várad Chapter at that time. At least 18% of the nearly 170 settlements documented in the county before 1241 disappeared during the Mongol invasion. Stephen V of Hungary exempted the peasants living in the estates of the bishop of Várad of royal taxation and granted the bishop the right to open mines in his estates in 1263 to promote the economic recovery of the bishopric. A silver mine was in short opened at the bishop's domains at Belényes (now Beiuș in Romania).

New fortresses were built during the decades following the withdrawal of the Mongols. Judge royal Paul Geregye erected Sólyomkő Castle at Élesd (now Aleșd in Romania); his sons held further 2 newly built fortresses in the 1270s. Their power was crushed during King Ladislaus the Cuman's reign; he granted their fortresses and domains to the Borsas. James Borsa, one of the semi-independent "oligarchs", was the actual ruler of Bihar, Kraszna, Szabolcs, Szatmár and Szolnok counties in the early . After James Borsa's fall in the late 1310s, the noble Czibak, Debreceni and Telegdi families became the wealthiest lay landowners in the county. The center of the Debrecenis' ancestral estates, Debrecen, developed into a market town.

One of the earliest references to the presence of Romanians in the county—the place name Olahteluk ("Vlachs' Plot")—was recorded in a non-authentic charter, dated to 1283. The first authentic document mentioning Romanians was issued in 1293. They lived in the region of the bishop's castle at Várasfenes (now Finiș in Romania). Next a charter of 1326 referred to the Romanian Voivode Neagul who "settled and lived" (considet and commoratur) in Nicholas Telegdi's estate at Káptalanhodos (now Hodiş in Romania). Historian Ioan Aurel Pop writes that the latter charter proves that Nicholas Telegdi's estate had originally owned by Voivode Neagul.

Modern Times 

After the Battle of Mohács, soon the Kingdom of Hungary was partitioned, the county's territory became part of the Eastern Hungarian Kingdom, then the Principality of Transylvania. A large part of it was ruled by Ottoman Empire as Varat Eyalet between 1660–1692, before it became part of the Kingdom of Hungary again.

Part of 's territory had previously belonged to the Hajdúság (see Hajdú County) and Szabolcs County. The pre-1848 counties of Hungary, including Bihar, were restored in October 1860.

In 1876 the Kingdom of Hungary was divided into seven Circles, with a total of 64 counties. The Circle on the left bank of the Theiss contained eight counties, including  ( means county), with the other seven being Békés, Hajdú, Máramaros, Szabolcs, Szatmár, Szilágy and Ugocsa. Bihar county in the Austro-Hungarian Empire contained Debrecen and Nagyvárad.

In 1920, by the Treaty of Trianon about 75% of the county became part of Romania. The west of the county remained in Hungary. The capital of this smaller county Bihar was Berettyóújfalu. In 1940, by the Second Vienna Award, the county's territory have been extended by its former parts gained from Romania.

In 1950, the Hungarian county Bihar was merged with Hajdú County to form Hajdú-Bihar county. The southernmost part of Hungarian Bihar (the area around Sarkad and Okány) went to Békés County.

The Romanian part of former Bihar County now forms the Romanian Bihor County, except the southernmost part (around Beliu), which is in Arad County.

Demographics

List of ispáns

Eleventh and twelfth centuries

Thirteenth century

Fourteenth century

Districts 
In the early 20th century, the districts (járás) and their capitals were:

The towns of Derecske, Berettyóújfalu, Biharnagybajom and Biharkeresztes are now in Hungary, while the other towns mentioned are in Romania.

Notes

References

Sources 

States and territories established in the 11th century
States and territories established in 1860
States and territories disestablished in 1920
States and territories disestablished in 1850
States and territories disestablished in 1950
Counties in the Kingdom of Hungary
Crișana